Userplane was a white-label product used primarily for online chat by online dating services and language learning sites.

History
Userplane was founded in 2001 by Mike Jones, Nate Thelen, and Javier Hall.

In April 2005, the company partnered with date.com.

In 2006, Userplane was acquired by AOL for $40 million.

In August 2008, CEO Mike Jones left Userplane. In 2009, he joined MySpace as CEO.

In October 2008, JS-Kit partnered with Userplane to distribute chat widgets.

Userplane shut down on August 1, 2013.

References

Companies established in 2001
Internet properties established in 2001
Internet properties disestablished in 2013